The Diocese of České Budějovice is a Roman Catholic diocese. It is situated almost entirely in Bohemia, with only small eastern section in Moravia. The diocese was founded on 20 September 1785, and its area is 12 500 km². Jan Prokop Schaaffgotsche was its first diocesan bishop and Vlastimil Kročil is its current bishop.

Statistics
Area: 
Residents/Catholics: 760,000/220,000
Divisions: 11 vicarates, 361 parishes

See also
List of bishops of České Budějovice
Reorganization of occupied dioceses during World War II
St. Catherine of Boletice

References

External links
Official Website of diocese (Czech)

Ceske Budejovice
Ceske
České Budějovice
Religious organizations established in 1785